On 3 May 2017, an explosion occurred at a depth of 1,200 meters in a tunnel of the Zemestan-Yurt coal mine, Golestan Province, Iran, when miners were trying to power a locomotive using an external battery. 42 people were killed in the accident and at least 75 injured, primarily from burns and inhalation of toxic gas.

References

2017 in Iran
2017 mining disasters
Mining in Iran
Explosions in Iran
Coal mining disasters in Asia